The 1997 Washington State Cougars football team was an American football team that represented Washington State University in the Pacific-10 Conference (Pac-10) during the 1997 NCAA Division I-A football season. In their ninth season under head coach Mike Price, the Cougars went 10–1 in the regular season (7–1 in Pac-10), won the conference championship, lost to #1 Michigan in the Rose Bowl, and outscored their opponents 483 to 296. They played their home games on campus at Martin Stadium in Pullman, Washington, and were ninth in the final rankings.

The team's statistical leaders included Ryan Leaf with 3,968 passing yards, Michael Black with 1,181 rushing yards, and Chris Jackson with 1,005 receiving yards.  Freshman defensive back Lamont Thompson led the team with 6 interceptions.

The Rose Bowl appearance was the first for Washington State in 67 years; the next was five years later.

Leaf decided to forgo his remaining season of eligibility (1998) and entered the 1998 NFL Draft, where he was the second overall selection.

Schedule

Roster

Game summaries

UCLA

    
    
    
    
    
    
    
    
    
    
    

UCLA took a 14-3 lead early in the second quarter, but Washington State exploded for 27 unanswered points to end the half. The Cougars led by as many as 16 on two occasions, but clung to just a 3-point lead late in the game. UCLA had a 4th and goal from the one-yard line with 2:50 remaining, but the Cougars stood tall to emerge victorious.

at No. 23 USC

    
    
    
    
    
    
    

Washington State defeated No. 23 USC in Los Angeles for the first time since 1957.

at Illinois

Boise State

at Oregon

California

Arizona

at No. 20 Arizona State

    
    
    
    
    
    
    
    
    
    
    
    

After trailing 24–0 midway through the second quarter, Washington State rallied to take a 25–24 lead early in the fourth quarter. After Arizona State answered with a touchdown, the Cougars were driving again. However, the Cougars were doomed by two late fumbles that were both returned for touchdowns.

Southwestern Louisiana

Stanford

at No. 20 Washington

vs. No. 1 Michigan (Rose Bowl)

Awards and honors
 Ryan Leaf – Sammy Baugh Trophy, Pac-10 Offensive Player of the Year, All-American, Third in Heisman Trophy voting
 Leon Bender – All-American
 Mike Price – Bobby Dodd Coach of the Year Award, Eddie Robinson Coach of the Year, Home Depot Coach of the Year Award, Sporting News College Football Coach of the Year, Pac-10 Coach of the Year

NFL Draft
Four Cougars were selected in the 1998 NFL Draft; quarterback Ryan Leaf was taken second overall.

References

Washington State
Washington State Cougars football seasons
Pac-12 Conference football champion seasons
Washington State Cougars football